TheatreWorks may refer to:

TheatreWorks (Silicon Valley), California
TheaterWorks (Hartford), Connecticut
TheatreWorksUSA
Theatre Works (Melbourne)
TheatreWorks (Singapore)